The goal of this article is to list all poems by Samuel Menashe, with chronology information.

List of poems

The Volume column gives the collection where the poem was first included. For now, only The Many Named Beloved (MNB), No Jerusalem But This (NJBT), Fringe of Fire (FF), The Niche Narrows (NN) and New and Selected Poems (NSP) were consulted. The year of first publication is given in First published and the review in Venue.

Notes 

Menashe, Samuel